Laila Thorsen (born 26 June 1967) is a Norwegian politician for the Labour Party.

She served as a deputy representative to the Parliament of Norway from Rogaland during the term 2009–2013.

She hails from Haugesund, heads the Norwegian Labour and Welfare Administration office in Vindafjord and is a board member of the Western Norway Regional Health Authority.

References

1967 births
Living people
People from Haugesund
Deputy members of the Storting
Labour Party (Norway) politicians
Rogaland politicians
Women members of the Storting